Olga Sedakova may refer to:

 Olga Sedakova (poet) (born 1949), Russian poet
 Olga Sedakova (synchronized swimmer) (born 1972), Olympic synchronized swimmer competing for Soviet Union and Russia